María Magdalena Guzmán Garza (16 May 1931 – 12 March 2015), better known as Magda Guzmán, was a Mexican film and television actress. She died of a myocardial infarction.

Filmography

Films

Television

Archive footage

Awards and nominations

References

External links

1931 births
2015 deaths
Mexican child actresses
Mexican telenovela actresses
Mexican television actresses
Mexican film actresses
Mexican stage actresses
Actresses from Coahuila
20th-century Mexican actresses
21st-century Mexican actresses
People from Saltillo